Open-source intelligence (OSINT) is the collection and analysis of data gathered from open sources (covert and publicly available sources) to produce actionable intelligence. OSINT is primarily used in national security, law enforcement, and business intelligence functions and is of value to analysts who use non-sensitive intelligence in answering classified, unclassified, or proprietary intelligence requirements across the previous intelligence disciplines.

OSINT sources can be divided up into six different categories of information flow:

Media, print newspapers, magazines, radio, and television from across and between countries.
Internet, online publications, blogs, discussion groups, citizen media (i.e. – cell phone videos, and user created content), YouTube, and other social media websites (i.e. – Facebook, Twitter, Instagram, etc.). This source also outpaces a variety of other sources due to its timeliness and ease of access.
Public government data, public government reports, budgets, hearings, telephone directories, press conferences, websites, and speeches. Although this source comes from an official source they are publicly accessible and may be used openly and freely.
Professional and academic publications, information acquired from journals, conferences, symposia, academic papers, dissertations, and theses.
Commercial data, commercial imagery, financial and industrial assessments, and databases.
Grey literature, technical reports, preprints, patents, working papers, business documents, unpublished works, and newsletters.

OSINT is distinguished from research in that it applies the process of intelligence to create tailored knowledge supportive of a specific decision by a specific individual or group.

Definition
OSINT is defined in the United States of America by Public Law 109-163 as cited by both the U.S. Director of National Intelligence and the U.S. Department of Defense (DoD), as intelligence "produced from publicly available information that is collected, exploited, and disseminated in a timely manner to an appropriate audience for the purpose of addressing a specific intelligence requirement."  As defined by NATO, OSINT is intelligence "derived from publicly available information, as well as other unclassified information that has limited public distribution or access."

According to political scientist Jeffrey T. Richelson, “open source acquisition involves procuring verbal, written, or electronically transmitted material that can be obtained legally. In addition to documents and videos available via the Internet or provided by a human source, others are obtained after U.S. or allied forces have taken control of a facility or site formerly operated by a foreign government or terrorist group.”

Former Assistant Director of Central Intelligence for Analysis Mark M. Lowenthal defines OSINT as “any and all information that can be derived from overt collection: all types of media, government reports and other documents, scientific research and reports, commercial vendors of information, the Internet, and so on. The main qualifiers to open-source information are that it does not require any type of clandestine collection techniques to obtain it and that it must be obtained through means that entirely meet the copyright and commercial requirements of the vendors where applicable."

History

OSINT in the United States traces its origins to the 1941 creation of the Foreign Broadcast Monitoring Service (FBMS), an agency responsible for the monitoring of foreign broadcasts. An example of their work was the correlation of changes in the price of oranges in Paris with successful bombings of railway bridges during World War II.

The Aspin-Brown Commission stated in 1996 that US access to open sources was "severely deficient" and that this should be a "top priority" for both funding and DCI attention.

In July 2004, following the September 11 attacks, the 9/11 Commission recommended the creation of an open-source intelligence agency. In March 2005, the Iraq Intelligence Commission recommended the creation of an open-source directorate at the CIA.

Following these recommendations, in November 2005 the Director of National Intelligence announced the creation of the DNI Open Source Center. The Center was established to collect information available from "the Internet, databases, press, radio, television, video, geospatial data, photos and commercial imagery." In addition to collecting openly available information, it would train analysts to make better use of this information. The center absorbed the CIA's previously existing Foreign Broadcast Information Service (FBIS), originally established in 1941, with FBIS head Douglas Naquin named as director of the center. Then, following the events of 9/11 the Intelligence Reform and Terrorism Prevention Act merged FBIS and other research elements into the Office of the Director of National Intelligence creating the Open Source Enterprise.

Furthermore, the private sector has invested in tools which aid in OSINT collection and analysis. Specifically, In-Q-Tel, a Central Intelligence Agency supported venture capital firm in Arlington, VA assisted companies develop web-monitoring and predictive analysis tools.

In December 2005, the Director of National Intelligence appointed Eliot A. Jardines as the Assistant Deputy Director of National Intelligence for Open Source to serve as the Intelligence Community's senior intelligence officer for open source and to provide strategy, guidance and oversight for the National Open Source Enterprise. Mr. Jardines has established the National Open Source Enterprise and authored intelligence community directive 301. In 2008, Mr. Jardines returned to the private sector and was succeeded by Dan Butler who is ADDNI/OS and previously Mr. Jardines' Senior Advisor for Policy.

Tools 
The web browser is a powerful OSINT tool that provides access to numerous websites and both open source and proprietary software tools that are either purpose-built for open source information collection or which can be exploited for the purposes of either gathering of open source information or to facilitate analysis and validation to provide intelligence. A cottage industry of both for-profit and not-for-profit investigative and educational groups such as Bellingcat, IntelTechniques  SANS and others offer indices, books, podcasts and video training materials on OSINT tools and techniques. Books such as Michael Bazzell's Open Source Intelligence Techniques serve as indices to resources across multiple domains but according the author, due to the rapidly changing information landscape, some tools and techniques change or become obsolete frequently, hence it is imperative for OSINT researchers to study, train and survey the landscape of source material regularly. A guide by Ryan Fedasiuk, an analyst at the Center for Security and Emerging Technology, lists six tools open-source analysts can use to stay safe and utlize operational security (OPSEC) when conducting online investigations. These include VPNs, cached webpages, digital archive services, URL and file scanners, browser sandbox applications, and antivirus software.

Numerous lists of aggregated OSINT content are available on the web. The OSINT Framework contains over 30 primary categories of tools and is maintained as an open source project on GitHub.

Risks for practitioners 
A main hindrance to practical OSINT is the volume of information it has to deal with ("information explosion"). The amount of data being distributed increases at a rate that it becomes difficult to evaluate sources in intelligence analysis. To a small degree the work has sometimes been done by amateur crowd-sourcing.

Accredited journalists have some protection in asking questions, and researching for recognized media outlets. Even so, they can be imprisoned, even executed, for seeking out OSINT. Private individuals illegally collecting data for a foreign military or intelligence agency is considered espionage in most countries. Of course, espionage that is not treason (i.e. betraying one's country of citizenship) has been a tool of statecraft since ancient times.

Professional Association

The OSINT Foundation is a professional association for OSINT practitioners in the United States Intelligence Community. It is open to U.S. Citizens and seeks to raise the prominence of the open-source intelligence discipline.

See also

Ashley Feinberg
Bellingcat
Co-occurrence networks
Dan Butler (civil servant)
DARPA TIDES program
Doxing
Eliot A. Jardines
Eliot Higgins
Fusion center
ICWatch
Intellipedia
Investigative Data Warehouse
MiTAP
National Intelligence Open Source Committee
NATO Open Source Intelligence Handbook, NATO Open Source Intelligence Reader
Open data
Open Source Center
Oryx (blog)
Private intelligence agency
Social cloud computing
Special Libraries Association
Strategic intelligence
Open-source intelligence in the 2022 Russian invasion of Ukraine

References

WashTimes.com, Washington Times – CIA mines 'rich' content from blogs, 19 April 2006
GCN.com, Government Computer News – Intelligence units mine the benefits of public sources 20 March 2006
AFCEA.org, SIGNAL Magazine – Intelligence Center Mines Open Sources March 2006
FindAcricles.com, Military Intelligence Professional Bulletin October–December, 2005 by Barbara G. Fast
FAS.org, Congressional Testimony on OSINT and Homeland Security 21 June 2005
FirstMonday.org, Open Source Intelligence by Stalder and Hirsh, 15 May 2002
Forbes.com, When Everyone Can Mine Your Data by Taylor Buley, 11.21.08]
 
Cnet.com, Maltego and the science of 'open-source' snooping by Matt Asay, November 25, 2008

Literature 

Scientific Publications

 Arthur S. Hulnick: 'The Dilemma of Open Source Intelligence: Is OSINT Really Intelligence?', pages 229–241, The Oxford Handbook of National Security Intelligence, 2010
 Cody Burke: 'Freeing knowledge, telling secrets: Open source intelligence and development', Bond University, May 2007 
 Florian Schaurer, Jan Störger: 'The Evolution of Open Source Intelligence', OSINT Report 3/2010, ISN, ETH Zürich, October 2010
 Abdelrahman Rashdan: 'The Social Media OSINT Challenge to US Intelligence: Culture Not Gigabytes', in New Media Politics Rethinking Activism and National Security in Cyberspace. Ed. Banu Baybars-Hawks. Cambridge Scholars Publishing, 2015

External links 
A Reverse Search Engine for OSINT
Hide and Seek : How to find anyone online (and hide)
An OSINT search of historic domain name whois records
The Open Source Intelligence Resource Discovery Toolkit
The New Craft of Intelligence: Making the Most of Open Private Sector Knowledge
Actual Intelligence Case Studies Leveraging Open Source Intelligence (OSINT)
Sailing the Sea of OSINT in the Information Age
 
  
Open Source Center – U.S. government arm focusing on open source intelligence under the DNI
 
Collection and Use of Open-Source Intelligence – A to Z
Open Source Intelligence (OSINT): Issues for Congress, Congressional Research Service, December 5, 2007
Open Source Intelligence (OSINT): Issues for Congress, Congressional Research Service, January 28, 2008
The Free Library, FMSO-JRIC and Open Source Intelligence: speaking prose in a world of verse, Military Intelligence Professional Bulletin, Oct–Dec, 2005 by Jacob W. Kipp

 
Applied data mining
Intelligence gathering disciplines
Collective intelligence
American inventions
2005 introductions
2005 establishments in the United States
Management cybernetics